Tup or TUP may refer to:

 Tup, an uncastrated male sheep
 Tupping, copulation in sheep, also the sheep mating season
Tup, falling weight carrying the top tool of a forging hammer or drop stamp.
 Ṭup (cuneiform), a sign in cuneiform writing
 Tup (album), an album by the alternative metal band Loppybogymi
 Tup, a Star Wars character
 Technological University of the Philippines
 Telephone User Part, a telephone system protocol used in some parts of the world
 Tupelo Regional Airport, Tupelo, Mississippi, US, IATA and FAA LID codes